The Defence-class ironclads were a class of two warships built for the Royal Navy between 1859 and 1862. They were initially armed with a mix of rifled breech-loading and muzzle-loading smoothbore guns, but the Armstrong breech-loading guns proved unreliable and were withdrawn from service after a few years.

Both ships were initially assigned to the Channel Squadron, but  was transferred to the Mediterranean Squadron in 1864. The ships were rearmed in the late 1860s after the completion of their first commission. They alternated between assignments with the fleet and guardship duties with the First Reserve for the rest of their careers. Resistance was the first to be paid off in 1880 and was used as a target for gunnery and torpedo trials beginning in 1885. She was sold for ship breaking in 1898, but wrecked en route to the breaker's yard.  was paid off in 1885 and she became a stationary training ship in 1890 until she was sold for scrap in 1935.

Background
In 1859 the Admiralty was not yet convinced that the very expensive (£377,000) s, which cost more than twice the wooden, steam-powered ships of the line, had to be accepted as the norm. They noted that the  armour plate of the Warriors was adequate to deflect all ordnance currently afloat, and high speed was not necessary to prevent existing wooden ships from massing their fire against the ironclads. Their Lordships therefore requested a design which, while carrying the same armour, was smaller and slower, and thus cheaper, than the Warriors. Rear Admiral Sir Baldwin Wake Walker, Controller of the Navy, proposed that six ships be built to this design, but he was over-ruled and only two were ordered on 14 December 1859.

The Admiralty's decision saddled the Royal Navy with a pair of ships that could not operate with the Warriors in a tactical squadron and were inferior to the French ironclads then under construction. The naval architect Sir Nathaniel Barnaby, a future Constructor of the Navy, considered that a Defence-class ship was worth one quarter of a Warrior in terms of combat, although they cost about two-thirds as much.

Description
The ships displaced  and had a tonnage of 3,710 tons burthen. Unlike their predecessors, they were fitted with a ram in the shape of a plough. The ends of the hull were subdivided by watertight transverse bulkheads and had a partial double bottom. Each ship had a complement of 460 officers and ratings. The Defence class was  shorter overall and displaced more than  less than the Warrior-class ironclads.

Propulsion
The Defence-class ships had a single two-cylinder trunk steam engine made by John Penn and Sons driving a single  propeller.

The lower masts and bowsprit were made of iron to withstand the shock of ramming. Both ships could make about  under sail alone. To reduce wind resistance while under sail alone, the funnel was semi-retractable. Similarly, the propeller could be hoisted up into the stern of the ship to reduce drag while under sail.

Armament
The armament of the Defence-class ships was intended to be 18 smoothbore, muzzle-loading 68-pounder guns, eight on each side on the main deck and one each fore and aft as chase guns on the upper deck, plus four Armstrong 40-pounder guns, an early rifled breech loader (RBL) design, as saluting guns. During construction the armament was changed to six (Defence) or eight (Resistance) of the new Armstrong rifled 7" breech-loading 110-pounder guns, ten 68-pounders, and either two 32-pounder smoothbores (Resistance) or four breech-loading  guns (Defence). The innovative  110-pounder, whose  shell could reach  was in short supply when the ironclads were launched, and poor results in armour-penetration tests halted plans to fully equip the ironclads with this gun. Furthermore, the 110-pounders proved problematic in service. They were labour-intensive to load and fire, and some of them blew up when other ships used them in action. After that, they were only used with a reduced propellant charge, which left them useless in practice.

Both ships were rearmed in the late 1860s with 14 seven-inch and two eight-inch rifled muzzle-loading guns. The new guns were heavier so fewer could be carried. On both ships the eight-inch guns were mounted amidships on the main deck on the broadside and a pair of seven-inch guns were mounted on the upper deck as fore and aft chase guns. Eight of the remaining seven-inch guns were also placed on the main deck on the broadside where they were protected by the ship's armour, but one pair was on the main deck further aft where they were not protected by armour. The two ships differed where the last pair of seven-inch guns was positioned: Defence mounted them on the main deck, forward of the armour, while Resistance mounted hers on the upper deck.

The  seven-inch gun fired a  shell and could penetrate  armour. All of the guns could fire both solid shot and explosive shells.

Armour

Transverse bulkheads 4.5 inches thick protected the guns on the main deck from raking fire. The ends of the ship were left entirely unprotected which meant that the steering gear was very vulnerable. They were, however, sub-divided into many watertight compartments to minimize any flooding.

Ships

Service
HMS Defence was assigned to the Channel Squadron upon completion in 1862. The ship was paid off in 1866 to refit and be re-armed and was briefly reassigned to the Channel Squadron again when she recommissioned in 1868. Defence had brief tours on the North American and Mediterranean Stations, from 1869 to 1872 before she was refitted again from 1872 to 1874. She became guard ship on the Shannon when she recommissioned. The ship was transferred to the Channel Squadron again in 1876 and then became guard ship in 1879 on the Mersey until 1885. Defence was placed in reserve until 1890 when she was assigned to the mechanical training school at Devonport in 1890. She was renamed Indus when the school adopted that name and served there until sold in 1935.

HMS Resistance was the first capital ship in the Royal Navy to be fitted with a ram and was given the nickname of Old Rammo. She was initially assigned to the Channel Squadron, but was transferred to the Mediterranean Squadron in 1864, the first ironclad to be assigned to that squadron. Resistance was rearmed in 1867 and became a guardship when recommissioned in 1869. The ship was reassigned to the Channel Fleet in 1873 before reverting to her former duties in 1877. Resistance was decommissioned in 1880 and was used for gunnery and torpedo trials beginning in 1885. The ship was sold for scrap in 1898 and foundered the following year en route to the breaker's yard. Her wreck was salvaged and later scrapped.

Notes

Footnotes

References
 

 

Battleship classes
 
Ship classes of the Royal Navy
Victorian-era battleships of the United Kingdom